The Tabacalera House is a heritage house in the City of San Fernando, Pampanga in the Philippines. 

Built by Tabacalera-owned by Don Ramon Lopez. The first floor of the house served as the office of La Tabacalera, the Compañía General de Tabacos de Filipinas. The property was owned by Simeon Ocampo. During the Japanese Occupation, it was sequestered by the Japanese Imperial Army together with other residences in San Fernando, and served as the headquarters of the Kempeitai.

Cultural Properties of the Philippines
Buildings and structures in San Fernando, Pampanga
Landmarks in the Philippines
Heritage Houses in the Philippines